Hefei No.7 High School was established in 1956 in Hefei, Anhui Province, China, located at 106 Wuhu Road, Baohe, Hefei, Anhui.

Hefei No.7 High School is one of the Model High Schools in Anhui. It is written as “合肥市第七中学” in Chinese. Since the school has won a bunch of honorary titles (e.g. the Civilization unit in Anhui, the Green School in Anhui), the school is going to found international classes which aim to provide opportunities for students to study abroad, especially focus on send them to the Top 100 universities in the US.
The school motto is “Aspire for being a human, desire to be an elite.”

References

Schools in China
1956 establishments in China